The Glan is a river in southwestern Germany, right tributary of the Nahe. It rises in the Saarland, northwest of Homburg. It flows generally north, through Rhineland-Palatinate, and empties into the Nahe near Odernheim am Glan, at Staudernheim, across the Nahe from Bad Sobernheim. Other towns along the Glan are Altenglan, Glan-Münchweiler, Lauterecken and Meisenheim.

Etymology 
The Celtic root of the name comes either from glann (shining) or from glen (U-shaped valley).

See also
List of rivers of Saarland
List of rivers of Rhineland-Palatinate

References 

Rivers and lakes of Western Palatinate
Rivers of Saarland
North Palatinate
Rivers of Germany